Fang Man may refer to:
 Fang Man (Masters of the Universe), a character in Masters of the Universe
 Fang Man (composer) (born 1977), Chinese-born composer in the United States